D1 Capital Partners is an American investment firm based in New York City, United States. The firm invests in both public and private markets globally.

Background 
D1 Capital Partners was founded in July 2018 by Daniel Sundheim. "D1" stands for "Day One," a concept espoused by Amazon.com, Inc.'s Jeff Bezos as detailed in Amazon's 1997 Letter to Shareholders. Sundheim was previously the Chief Investment Officer of Viking Global Investors and put in more than $500 million of his own money to start the firm. D1 Capital Partners is usually grouped with other Tiger Cub funds due to the firm being spun out from one.

The firm originally managed $3 billion of capital, which rose to $20 billion by the end of 2020 with annualized returns of nearly 30%. D1 returned 60% in 2020.

In January 2021, the firm lost $4 billion (20% of its capital) due to the GameStop short squeeze. As of April 2021, D1 had recouped about 90% of what it lost in January.

In June 2021, the firm signed a 10-year lease to open another office in Miami, Florida.

In May 2022, It was reported that the fund lost 23% of it value since start of the year with its public equities strategy losing 44%.

In February 2023, it was reported that they own 7.4% of RH, furniture company.

Business Overview 
D1 Capital Partners focuses on companies within the consumer, business services, financial services, healthcare, industrials, real estate, and technology, media and telecommunication sectors.

Regarding the public markets, the firm invests in publicly traded equities and other related securities such as equity derivatives and convertible bonds. It utilizes a global Long/short equity strategy with a focus on medium to long-term returns.

Regarding the private markets, the firm primarily focuses on taking later-stage, non-controlling stakes in companies in order to help them further expand.

Private Equity Funds

Notable venture capital investments 

 Robinhood
 Airtable
 GitLab
 Sweetgreen
 Scopely
 goPuff
 Shippo
Instacart
Wise
Unity Technologies
Warby Parker
DriveNets

References

2018 establishments in New York City
Financial services companies established in 2018
Hedge fund firms in New York City
Investment management companies of the United States
Privately held companies based in New York City
Tiger Management
Venture capital firms